From February 8 to June 14, 1988, voters of the Democratic Party chose its nominee for president in the 1988 United States presidential election.

Massachusetts governor Michael Dukakis was selected as the nominee through a series of primary elections and caucuses culminating in the 1988 Democratic National Convention held from July 18 to July 21, 1988, in Atlanta, Georgia.

Background 
Having been badly defeated in the 1984 presidential election, the Democrats in 1985 and 1986 were eager to find a new approach to win the presidency. They created the Democratic Leadership Council (DLC), with the aim of recruiting a candidate for the 1988 election.

The large gains in the 1986 mid-term elections (which resulted in the Democrats taking back control of the Senate after six years of Republican rule) and the continuing Iran–Contra affair gave Democrats confidence in the run-up to the primary season.

Candidates

Nominee

Withdrew during primaries or convention

Other notable candidates campaigning for the nomination but receiving less than 1% of the national vote included:

 Governor of Arizona Bruce Babbitt (withdrew February 16)
 Activist and conspiracy theorist Lyndon LaRouche
 Former Grand Wizard of the Ku Klux Klan David Duke (campaign) 
 Representative James Traficant of Ohio
 Representative Douglas Applegate of Ohio

Withdrew before primaries

Declined
 Senator Lloyd Bentsen of Texas
 Senator Ted Kennedy of Massachusetts (December 19, 1985)
 Businessman Lee Iacocca (July 16, 1986)
 Governor Mario Cuomo of New York (February 19, 1987)
 Senator Sam Nunn of Georgia (February 21, 1987)
 Senator Dale Bumpers of Arkansas (March 20, 1987)
 Governor Bill Clinton of Arkansas (July 15, 1987)
 Senator Bill Bradley of New Jersey (August 2, 1987)
 Former Governor Chuck Robb of Virginia (November 12, 1987)

Polling

Nationwide polling 
Before 1987

1987

1988

Head-to-head polling

Statewide and regional polling
South

California

Maryland

New Hampshire

Pre-primary events

The Hart-Rice affair 

The Democratic front-runner for most of 1987 was former Colorado Senator Gary Hart.  Hart had made a strong showing in the 1984 primaries and, after Mondale's defeat in the presidential election, had positioned himself as the moderate centrist many Democrats felt their party would need to win.

However, questions and rumors about possible extramarital affairs and about past debts dogged Hart's campaign. One of the great myths is that Senator Hart challenged the media to "put a tail" on him and that reporters then took him up on that challenge. In fact, Hart had told E. J. Dionne of The New York Times that if reporters followed him around, they would "be bored". However, in a separate investigation, the Miami Herald claimed to have received an anonymous tip from a friend of Donna Rice that Rice was involved with Hart. It was only after Hart had been discovered that the Herald reporters found Hart's quote in a pre-print of The New York Times Magazine.

On May 8, 1987, a week after the Donna Rice story broke, Hart dropped out of the race.

In December 1987, Hart surprised many political pundits by resuming his presidential campaign. He again led in the polls for the Democratic nomination, both nationally and in Iowa. However, the allegations of adultery and reports of irregularities in his campaign financing had delivered a fatal blow to his candidacy, and he fared poorly in the early primaries before dropping out again.

The Hart scandal would later be depicted in the 2018 film The Front Runner, with Hugh Jackman portraying Hart.

Biden plagiarism scandals 

Delaware Senator Joe Biden led a highly competitive campaign which ended in controversy after he was accused of plagiarizing a speech by Neil Kinnock, then-leader of the British Labour Party. Though Biden had correctly credited the original author in all speeches but one, the one of which he failed to make mention of the originator was caught on video and sent to the press by members of the Dukakis campaign. In the video Biden is filmed repeating a stump speech by Kinnock, with only minor modifications. Michael Dukakis later acknowledged that his campaign was responsible for leaking the tape, and two members of his staff resigned.

It was also discovered that Biden had been guilty of plagiarism years before, while a student at the Syracuse University College of Law in the 1960s. Though Biden professed his integrity, the impression lingering in the media as the result of this double punch would lead him to drop out of the race. He formally suspended his campaign on September 28, 1987.

The Delaware Supreme Court's Board on Professional Responsibility would later clear Biden of the law school plagiarism charges.

After campaigns in 2008 and 2020, Biden was elected Vice President in 2008 and President in 2020.

Endorsements 
Michael Dukakis
Senator Donald Riegle of Michigan

Jesse Jackson
Senator Ernest Hollings of South Carolina
 Former Governor Orval Faubus of Arkansas
Mayor Bernie Sanders of Burlington, Vermont
Mayor Harold Washington of Chicago, Illinois
 Mayor Richard Arrington Jr. of Birmingham, Alabama
Actor and comedian Bill Cosby
Activist Paul Wellstone
The Nation

Al Gore
 Georgia House of Representatives Speaker Tom Murphy
 Texas House of Representatives Speaker Gib Lewis
 Florida House of Representatives Speaker Jon L. Mills

Dick Gephardt
 Representative Tony Coelho of California
 Representative Martin Frost of Texas
 Representative Marvin Leath of Texas
 Representative Mike Synar of Oklahoma
 Representative Claude Pepper of Florida
 Representative Sander Levin of Michigan

Gary Hart
 Actor Warren Beatty

Results
In the Iowa caucuses, Gephardt finished first, Simon finished second, and Dukakis finished third. In the New Hampshire primary, Dukakis finished first, Gephardt finished second, and Simon finished third. Dukakis and Gore campaigned hard against Gephardt with negative ads, and eventually the United Auto Workers retracted their endorsement of Gephardt, who was heavily dependent on labor union backing.

In the Super Tuesday races, Dukakis won six primaries, Gore five, Jackson five and Gephardt one, with Gore and Jackson splitting the southern states. The next week, Simon won Illinois. 1988 is tied with 1992 as the race with the most candidates winning primaries since the McGovern reforms of 1971. Gore's effort to paint Dukakis as too liberal for the general election proved unsuccessful and he eventually withdrew. Jackson focused more on getting enough delegates to make sure African-American interests were represented in the platform than on winning outright. Dukakis eventually emerged as the party's nominee.

Convention and general election

The Democratic Party Convention was held in Atlanta, Georgia, July 18–21. The Dukakis nominating speech delivered by Arkansas governor and future president Bill Clinton was widely criticized as too long and tedious.

Texas State Treasurer Ann Richards (who two years later became the state governor) delivered a memorable keynote address in which she uttered the lines "Poor George [Bush], he can't help it, he was born with a silver foot in his mouth." Six years later, Bush's son George W. Bush would deny Richards re-election as Texas Governor.

With most candidates having withdrawn and asking their delegates to vote for Dukakis, the tally for president was as follows:
 Michael Dukakis - 2,877 (70.09%)
 Jesse Jackson - 1,219 (29.70%)
 Richard Stallings - 3 (0.07%)
 Joe Biden - 2 (0.05%)
 Dick Gephardt - 2 (0.05%)
 Lloyd Bentsen - 1 (0.02%)
 Gary Hart - 1 (0.02%)

Jesse Jackson's campaign believed that since they had come in a respectable second, Jackson was entitled to the vice presidential spot. Dukakis refused, and gave the spot to Lloyd Bentsen.

Bentsen was selected in large part to secure the state of Texas and its large electoral vote for the Democrats. During the vice-presidential debate, Republican candidate and Senator Dan Quayle ignored a head-on confrontation with Bentsen (aside from the "Jack Kennedy" comparison) and spent his time attacking Dukakis.

See also
 1988 Republican Party presidential primaries

Notes

References

External links
 Booknotes interview with Jeanne Simon on Codename: ScarlettLife on the Campaign Trail by the Wife of a Presidential Candidate, July 23, 1989.
 Booknotes interview with Dayton Duncan on Grass Roots: One Year in the Life of the New Hampshire Presidential Primary, March 31, 1991.